The Flying Horseman is a 1926 American silent Western film directed by Orville O. Dull and written by Gertrude Orr. The film stars Buck Jones, Gladys McConnell, Bruce Covington, Walter Percival, Hank Mann, and Harvey Clark. The film was released on September 5, 1926, by Fox Film Corporation.

Cast  
 Buck Jones as Mark Winton
 Gladys McConnell as June Savary
 Bruce Covington as Col. Savary
 Walter Percival as Bert Ridley
 Hank Mann as Newton Carey
 Harvey Clark as Happy Joe
 Vester Pegg as Henchman
 Joe Rickson as Henchman
 Silver as Silver Dollar

References

External links

 

1926 films
1926 Western (genre) films
Fox Film films
American black-and-white films
Silent American Western (genre) films
1920s English-language films
1920s American films